DWRV (1233 AM) Radyo Veritas is a radio station owned and operated by the Diocese of Bayombong under Global Broadcasting System. The station's studio and transmitter are located at Maharlika Hi-way, Brgy. Luyang, Bayombong.

References

Radio stations established in 1991
Catholic radio stations
Radio stations in Nueva Vizcaya